Kowsar Riz (also Romanized as Kows̄ar Rīz) is a village in Eslamiyeh Rural District, in the Central District of Rafsanjan County, Kerman Province, Iran. At the 2006 census, its population was 1,561, in 350 families.

References 

Populated places in Rafsanjan County